Naran (romanized: Nārān, IPA: [nɑːɾɑːn]) is a town and popular tourist destination in upper Kaghan Valley in the Mansehra District of the Khyber Pakhtunkhwa province of Pakistan. It is one of the most popular tourist attraction locally as well as internationally. Naran valley is also Pakistan's most visited Valley, around 1.5 million people visit Naran valley every year.

Tourism In Naran 
Naran Kaghan is famous as a tourist destination, owing to its pleasant weather in peak season every year thousands of tourists rush to explore the valley. It is also the gateway to Gilgit Hunza in Summers by Babusar Pass. Naran Bazaar is very crowded in the summers with hotels and restaurants offering their services. In 2020, the government expects that 5 million tourists will explore the valley.

Climate

Naran has a humid continental climate (Koppen Climate Classification Dfb). There is significant rainfall in summers and heavy snowfall in winters. The region is Alpine in geography and climate, with forests and meadows dominating the landscape. The weather usually remains cloudy throughout the year. During winters the temperature often remains below 0 °C with heavy snowfall. In summers the temperature rarely exceeds 15 °C with heavy rainfall. Naran remains busy in summer, starting earlier, and tourism is extending up to late in the fall. The average annual temperature in Naran is 10.1 °C.

See also 
 Saiful Muluk Lake
 Lulusar Lake
 Dudipatsar Lake
 Pyala Lake

References 

Populated places in Mansehra District
Tourist attractions in Khyber Pakhtunkhwa